Frederick William Fane Hervey, 4th Marquess of Bristol MVO (8 November 1863 – 24 October 1951) was a British nobleman, naval officer and Conservative Party politician.

Background
Hervey was the son of Lord Augustus Henry Charles Hervey (1837–1875), the younger brother of the 3rd Marquess of Bristol. He was born in Dresden, Germany, where his father was stationed.

He was educated at Tonbridge School and Eastman's Royal Naval Academy before joining HMS Britannia as a cadet in January 1877. He was a midshipman by the age of 15.

Naval and political career
In August 1901 he was appointed to command the cruiser , which was commissioned to serve in the Channel Squadron the following September. He was promoted to captain on 31 December 1901 and served in this rank for a decade, commanding the battleship Renown for two months in late 1907.  He was placed on the Retired List at the rank of rear admiral in May 1911.

Hervey was elected at the general election in January 1906 as Member of Parliament (MP) for Bury St Edmunds, but automatically resigned in August the following year when he succeeded his uncle in the peerages. He later became chairman of West Suffolk County Council from 1915 to 1934.

Family

The 4th Marquess married the heiress Alice Frances Theodora Wythes (1875–1957) in 1896. They had two daughters, Lady Marjorie Hervey. Marjorie married John Erskine, Lord Erskine.

In 1907 the family moved from the lodge into Ickworth House, the family seat, which like most pre-War English country houses, maintained a large retinue. Feudal traditions still held sway, and the estate's tenants did not dare complain of poor housing, according to a memoir by the village schoolmistress. The 4th Marquess's brother was Lord Manner Hervey, rector 1900–1944 of the nearby village of Horringer, who also took services at Ickworth Church, the younger brother preaching to the elder.

Lord Bristol was succeeded by his youngest brother Lord Herbert Hervey.

References

External links 
 

1863 births
1951 deaths
104
Conservative Party (UK) MPs for English constituencies
Royal Navy rear admirals
UK MPs 1906–1910
Bristol, M4
Frederick Hervey, 4th Marquess of Bristol
People educated at Eastman's Royal Naval Academy
People educated at Tonbridge School
Members of West Suffolk County Council
Members of the Royal Victorian Order